Eshqabad Rural District is a rural district (dehestan) in Miyan Jolgeh District, Nishapur County, Razavi Khorasan province, Iran. At the 2006 census, its population was 15,280, in 3,852 families.  The rural district has 43 villages.

References 

Rural Districts of Razavi Khorasan Province
Nishapur County